EchoStar Mobile, an Irish company with commercial operations headquartered in the United Kingdom and a data centre based in Griesheim, Germany, is a mobile operator that provides connectivity across Europe through a converged satellite and terrestrial network. EchoStar Mobile is a subsidiary of EchoStar Corporation, a provider of satellite communications devices.

History 
EchoStar Mobile Limited was established in 2008 as Solaris Mobile, a joint venture company between SES and Eutelsat Communications to develop and commercialize the first geostationary satellite systems in Europe for broadcasting video, radio and data to in-vehicle receivers and to mobile devices, such as mobile phones, portable media players and PDAs. In January 2014 all stock in Solaris Mobile was acquired by EchoStar Corporation and in March 2015 the company was renamed EchoStar Mobile.

The agreement to set up Solaris Mobile was reached in 2006 with the company formed in 2008. SES and Eutelsat – both successful European satellite operators, providing TV and other services from geostationary satellites to millions of cable and direct-to-home viewers – invested €130m in the venture. The services to be developed included video, radio, multimedia data, interactive services, and voice communications, with the primary aim of delivering mobile television any time, anywhere. Its headquarters is in Dublin, Ireland.

Solaris Mobile's first commercial contract was with Italian media publishing group Class Editori, to launch a digital radio service in Italy. A hybrid satellite/terrestrial network will initially be deployed in Milan, in October 2011 and extended across the country in 2012. Solaris claims that the network will enable Italians to access dozens of new digital radio channels broadcasting music, news, entertainment and sports, in their original format with continuity of reception across the entire country, and that the digital audio signal will be complemented with new visual media services such as programme information and traffic data.

Applications
The EU Telecoms Commissioner, Viviane Reding, has commented, "Mobile satellite services have huge potential: they can enable Europeans to access new communication services, particularly in rural and less populated regions."

Solaris Mobile primarily intends to provide mobile TV and interactive services to handheld and vehicle receivers. For in-vehicle use, the mobile satellite receivers could also double as web browsers providing full Internet access, and deliver interactive services such as online reservations, emergency warnings, or toll payments.

The coverage across Europe will also enable the system to be used for situations when other means of communication are not possible, such as gathering data (traffic, weather, pollution) from moving vehicles, and support for emergency and rescue services in isolated regions, under extreme conditions or when terrestrial networks have been compromised.

To avoid the requirement for mobile phones with S-band reception for the satellite services, Solaris Mobile has developed a 'Pocket Gateway' in conjunction with Finnish company Elekrobit. The Gateway is a compact S-band receiver which decodes DVB-SH transmissions from the Solaris satellite and relays them over WiFi to any compatible handset with a web browser. The Gateway is also planned to be used in vehicles with a roof-mounted antenna for S-band reception with services accessed on passengers' mobile phones. The technology was demonstrated at the GSMA Mobile World Congress in Barcelona in February 2010.

Technology
The Solaris Mobile services use DVB-SH technology to deliver IP based data and media content to handheld and in-vehicle terminals using a hybrid satellite/terrestrial system with satellite transmission serving the whole of Europe and beyond, and terrestrial repeaters for urban and indoor penetration.

The S-band frequencies used (2.00 GHz) are reserved for the exclusive use of satellite and terrestrial mobile services, and sit alongside the UMTS frequencies already in use across Europe for 3G terrestrial mobile phone services, allowing the reuse of existing cellular towers and antennas, and the simple incorporation of Solaris services in mobile handsets.

Handsets equipped with the first DVB-SH chipsets were successfully demonstrated live at the Mobile World Congress in Barcelona in February 2008.

Solaris was intended to first use the Eutelsat W2A satellite at 10° east, which contains an S-band payload, and was scheduled for launch in early 2009. However, following the successful launch on April 3, 2009, the S-band payload was found to show "an anomaly" which has put in doubt the payload's capability to provide mobile satellite services for Solaris.

Further testing of the satellite was undertaken to establish its future in the Solaris programme. Investigation of S-band payload has confirmed significant non-compliance from its original specifications. On 1 July 2009, Solaris Mobile filed an insurance claim. The technical findings indicate that the company should be able to offer some, but not all of the services it was planning to offer.

Regulatory
On June 30, 2008 the European Parliament and the Council adopted the European's Decision to establish a single selection and authorisation process to ensure a coordinated introduction of mobile satellite services (MSS) in Europe. The selection process was launched in August 2008 and attracted four applications by prospective operators (ICO, Inmarsat, Solaris Mobile, TerreStar).

In May 2009, the European Commission selected two operators, Inmarsat Ventures and Solaris Mobile, giving these operators "the right to use the specific radio frequencies identified in the Commission's decision and the right to operate their respective mobile satellite systems". EU Member States now have to ensure that the two operators have the right to use the specific radio frequencies identified in the commission's decision and the right to operate their respective mobile satellite systems for 18 years from the selection decision. The operators are compelled to start operations within 24 months from the selection decision.

Although the EU's decision was announced days after the apparent failure of the payload intended to serve Solaris, the company remains confident of "its ability to meet the commitments made under the European Commission selection process".

In May 2010, Solaris Mobile announced that following the granting of spectrum by the European Commission, the company had been actively pursuing licenses from European member states and it had just been granted 18-year licences to operate Mobile Satellite Services in France, Sweden and Germany, to add to existing licenses for Finland, Luxembourg, Italy, and Slovenia.

See also
DVB-SH
EchoStar Corporation
SES
Eutelsat
S-band

References

SES S.A.
Satellite television
Interactive television
Satellite operators
Mobile web
Mobile television